Zinc finger protein 224 is a protein that in humans is encoded by the ZNF224 gene.

References

Further reading